The 2012 Rugby Championship was the inaugural annual rugby union series between the national rugby union teams of New Zealand, Australia, South Africa, and Argentina. For sponsorship reasons, the competition was known as The Castle Rugby Championship in South Africa, The Investec Rugby Championship in New Zealand, The Castrol Edge Rugby Championship in Australia and The Personal Rugby Championship in Argentina.

The 2012 Rugby Championship kicked off on 18 August with New Zealand defeating Australia and finished on 6 October. Each team played the other twice on a home and away basis. The inaugural Championship was won by New Zealand, which was their 11th Southern Hemisphere title including the Tri Nations.

Standings

Fixtures

Round 1

Man of the Match
Israel Dagg (New Zealand)

Touch judges:
Nigel Owens (Wales)
Lourens van der Merwe (South Africa)
Television match official:
Matt Goddard (Australia)

Man of the Match
Morné Steyn (South Africa)

Touch judges:
Jérôme Garcès (France)
John Lacey (Ireland)
Television match official:
Johann Meuwesen (South Africa)

Round 2

Man of the Match:
Sonny Bill Williams (New Zealand)

Touch judges:
Alain Rolland (Ireland)
Lourens van der Merwe (South Africa)
Television match official:
Ben Skeen (New Zealand)

Man of the Match
Rodrigo Roncero (Argentina)

Touch judges:
Jérôme Garcès (France)
John Lacey (Ireland)
Television match official:
Francisco Pastrana (Argentina)

Round 3

Man of the Match
Marcelo Bosch (Argentina)

Touch judges:
George Clancy (Ireland)
James Leckie (Australia)
Television match official:
Vinny Munro (New Zealand)

Man of the Match
Berrick Barnes (Australia)

Touch judges:
Wayne Barnes (England)
Glen Jackson (New Zealand)
Television match official:
Matt Goddard (Australia)

Round 4

Man of the Match:
Israel Dagg (New Zealand)

Touch judges:
Romain Poite (France)
James Leckie (Australia)
Television match official:
Vinny Munro (New Zealand)

Man of the Match:
Digby Ioane (Australia)

Touch judges:
Nigel Owens (Wales)
Glen Jackson (New Zealand)
Television match official:
Matt Goddard (Australia)

Round 5

Man of the Match:
Bryan Habana (South Africa)

Touch judges:
Romain Poite (France)
Greg Garner (England)
Television match official:
Shaun Veldsman (South Africa)

Man of the Match:
Kieran Read (New Zealand)

Touch judges:
Craig Joubert (South Africa)
Pascal Gaüzère (France)
Television match official:
Francisco Pastrana (Argentina)

Round 6

Man of the Match:
Kieran Read (New Zealand)

Touch judges:
Romain Poite (France)
Greg Garner (England)
Television match official:
Shaun Veldsman (South Africa)

Man of the Match:
Michael Hooper (Australia)

Touch judges:
Jaco Peyper (South Africa)
Pascal Gaüzère (France)
Television match official:
Francisco Pastrana (Argentina)

Warm up matches
On 4 August and 11 August, Argentina played two uncapped matches against a Stade Français team in Argentina.

Squads

Summary

Note: Ages are as of 18 August 2012 – the starting date of the tournament.

Argentina
Head coach:  Santiago Phelan

Australia
Head coach:  Robbie Deans

New ZealandHead coach''':  Steve Hansen
 Caps Updated 24/06/2012

South AfricaHead Coach:'''  Heyneke Meyer

Statistics

Try scorers

Points scorers

See also
 History of rugby union matches between Argentina and Australia
 History of rugby union matches between Argentina and New Zealand
 History of rugby union matches between Argentina and South Africa
 History of rugby union matches between Australia and South Africa
 History of rugby union matches between Australia and New Zealand
 History of rugby union matches between New Zealand and South Africa

References

External links
 Argentina 2012 Rugby Championship website
 Australia 2012 Rugby Championship website
 New Zealand 2012 Rugby Championship website
 
 2012 Rugby Championship at ESPN Scrum

2012
2012 in Australian rugby union
2012 in New Zealand rugby union
2012 in South African rugby union
2012 rugby union tournaments for national teams
2012 in Argentine rugby union